James Griffyth Fairfax (15 July 188627 January 1976) was a British poet, translator, and politician.

Biography
Fairfax, a great-grandson of the Australian newspaper tycoon John Fairfax, was a member of the Fairfax family, and was educated at Winchester School and New College, Oxford. Fairfax departed permanently from Australia in 1904.

He served in the 15th Indian Division for the duration of the First World War, and rose to the rank of captain in the Army Service Corps.

His first volume of poetry was published in 1906. He was also active in literary circles and had an influence on and was influenced by his friend Ezra Pound.

Fairfax was a Member of the UK House of Commons representing the borough constituency of Norwich for the Conservative and Unionist Party from the 1924 election until the 1929 election.

Published works

Poetry

References

External links 
 
 J. Griffyth Fairfax Collextion at the Harry Ransom Center at the University of Texas at Austin

Alumni of New College, Oxford
Royal Army Service Corps officers
British Army personnel of World War I
Conservative Party (UK) MPs for English constituencies
James Griffyth
UK MPs 1924–1929
1886 births
1976 deaths
Place of birth missing
Place of death missing
People educated at Winchester College
English male poets
20th-century English male writers